Santiago Amoltepec is a town and municipality in the state of Oaxaca in south-western Mexico. The municipality covers an area of 142.99 km². 
It is part of the Sola de Vega District in the Sierra Sur Region.

As of 2005, the municipality has a total population of 11,113.

References

Municipalities of Oaxaca